The Masked Gang: Cyprus is a 2008 Turkish comedy film directed by Murat Aslan. The film, which is about an incompetent gang of criminals attempting to go straight, is a sequel to The Masked Gang (2005) and The Masked Gang: Iraq (2007).

Synopsis
After an unsuccessful bank robbery, as well as the failure of a spontaneous ambush upon the oil plant in Iraq, the clumsiest comedy heroes of Turkish Cinema finally decide to retire from their small criminal lives. However, the dignified career as exterminator suffers many infamous perils, as the lovable idiots inhale more insecticide than the insects themselves. Thus the doctor prescribes a vacation at the seaside. But then there is Rocky Selim, a wicked crook from the underworld, disguised as an honorable businessman, who is planning a perfect casino robbery in North Cyprus. His plan is flawless, yet he is desperately in need of a criminal gang to carry out his plan. As a fortunate coincidence, the paths of the masked gang overlap with Rocky Selim, who hires them instantly. As usual, with no preparations at all, overzealous and bustling, the masked gang follows the call of the justice a bit too spontaneously, and starts implementing the plans of Rocky Selim, with the methods of complete madmen.

Release

Reception
The movie reached number one at the Turkish box office and was the sixth-highest-grossing Turkish film of 2008 with a total gross of $5,575,199. It remained in the Turkish box-office charts for twenty-six weeks and made a total worldwide gross of $7,006,849.

References

External links
 Official site for the international distributor
 

2000s crime comedy films
2008 films
2000s Turkish-language films
Films set in Turkey
Turkish crime comedy films
2000s heist films
2008 comedy films